is a former professional Japanese baseball player.

External links

1975 births
Living people
Baseball people from Tokyo
Japanese baseball players
Nippon Professional Baseball infielders
Hiroshima Toyo Carp players
Orix BlueWave players
Orix Buffaloes players
Japanese baseball coaches
Nippon Professional Baseball coaches
People from Edogawa, Tokyo